The 1999 World Table Tennis Championships women's doubles was the 44th edition of the women's doubles championship.
Li Ju and Wang Nan defeated Yang Ying and Sun Jin in the final by three sets to nil.

Results

See also
List of World Table Tennis Championships medalists

References

-
World